Ala-ud-Din Alam Shah was the fourth and last ruler of the Sayyid dynasty which ruled the Delhi Sultanate. He did not go on much campaigns as a ruler and mostly spent his time reading the Quran.

Life 
Born Ala ud-Din, he succeeded his father, Muhammad Shah to the throne and took on the regnal name of Alam Shah ("World King"). 

Alam Shah abandoned his charge in 1448 leaving Delhi and retired to Budaun. Three years later, Bahlul Lodi, who had made two prior attempts at capturing Delhi, took control of the capital to mark the beginning of the Lodi dynasty.

Notes

References
 
 

Sayyid dynasty
Indian people of Arab descent